Caskey School of Divinity (active 2010–2015), located in Pineville, Louisiana, was a divinity school affiliated with Louisiana College and the Louisiana Baptist Convention.

Loss of Funding

In 2013, the dean of the Caskey Divinity School, Charles Quarles, filed a whistleblower report against the then-president of Louisiana College, Joe W. Aguillard, alleging that Aguillard had misappropriated funds from the Caskey Divinity School for another, unauthorized project. A follow-up investigation by a New Orleans law firm confirmed the whistleblower report, concluding that Aguillard had "intentionally misled the Louisiana College administration, the Board of Trustees, and donors regarding a $10 million pledge from the Cason Foundation.". During an April 30 meeting of Louisiana College's board of trustees, the board voted to exonerate Aguillard despite the whistleblower's reports. The board likewise refused to hear any statements from the Caskey School's primary donor, Edgar Cason. As a result, the Cason foundation revoked any further funding for the Caskey School of Divinity.

Results of the Aguillard Controversy 
After the loss of funding and the Board's exoneration of Aguillard, Charles Quarles offered his resignation from the school. Three other professors associated with the divinity school, including the Associate Dean Jason Hiles, had already been served notice of non-renewal of their contracts as a result of accusations by President Aguillard. Aguillard had claimed, soon after the filing of Quarles' whistleblower report, that the non-renewals were due to a theological conflict concerning calvinism. As a result of the loss of the majority of the school's faculty, many of its full time students withdrew from the Caskey Divinity school. The Associate Dean of Christian Ministry, Argile Smith, took over the responsibilities of Dean at the Caskey School until he succeeded President Aguillard as interim president of Louisiana College in 2016. The Cason Foundation allowed the remaining students to finish their studies without losing their scholarships, but no further scholarships were to be offered (the school's primary source of finances). The school is not accepting students and its domain name, www.divinity.lacollege.edu, is no longer active.

Mission

The mission of Louisiana College is to provide liberal arts, professional, and graduate programs characterized by devotion to the preeminence of the Lord Jesus, allegiance to the authority of the Holy Scriptures, dedication to academic excellence for the glory of God, and commitment to change the world for Christ by the power of the Holy Spirit.

The Caskey School of Divinity supported this mission by training coming generations of future leaders to 1) to correctly handle the word of truth (2 Tim 2:15), 2) to preach the word (2 Tim 4:2), 3) to emphasize the great truths of the Christian faith in their preaching and teaching (1 Tim 4:16), 4) to share the gospel passionately with the lost (2 Tim 4:5), and 5) to model outstanding Christian character (1 Tim 3).

Academics

The school offered a Master of Arts (M.A.) in Pastoral Ministry, an M.A. in Biblical & Theological Studies, an Associate of Arts (A.A.) in Pastoral Ministry, and a Certificate in Pastoral Ministry. The school is accredited by the Southern Association of Colleges and Schools (SACS).

Master of Arts

 Pastoral Ministry (36 total hours)
 Biblical & Theological Studies (48 total hours)

Associate of Arts

 Pastoral Ministry (60 total hours, terminal degree)

Certificate

 Advanced Certificate in Pastoral Ministry (30 total hours)
 Certificate in Pastoral Ministry (12 total hours)

References

External links 
 Caskey School of Divinity
 Louisiana College

Seminaries and theological colleges in Louisiana